Theca interna cells express receptors for luteinizing hormone (LH) to produce androstenedione, which via a few steps, gives the granulosa the precursor for estrogen manufacturing.

After rupture of the mature ovarian follicle, the theca interna cells differentiate into the theca lutein cells of the corpus luteum. Theca lutein cells secrete androgens and progesterone. Theca lutein cells are also known as small luteal cells.

See also
 theca folliculi

References

External links
 
  - "Mammal, canine ovary (LM, High)"
  - "Mammal, bovine ovary (LM, Medium)"
  - interna
 
 Slide at trinity.edu

Mammal female reproductive system
Steroid hormone secreting cells
Human female endocrine system